Liam Michael Sercombe (born 25 April 1990) is an English professional footballer who plays as a midfielder for Cheltenham Town.

Career

Exeter City
Sercombe came through the youth ranks at Exeter City, and signed a full professional contract with the club in June 2007.

Sercombe made a number of appearances at reserve team level before making his debut on 11 August 2007 against Altrincham in the Conference National, coming on after just 11 minutes to replace the injured Andy Taylor. Exeter went on to win the match 4–1. Sercombe made seven appearances that season, helping Exeter win promotion to League Two after a five-year absence, as they beat Torquay United in the play-off semi-finals, and then Cambridge United 1–0 in the final at Wembley Stadium.

Sercombe began to play more regularly the following season and scored his first goal on 21 October 2008 as Exeter beat Port Vale 3–1 at Vale Park. He scored his second goal for the club in a 2–1 away win against Luton Town.

Exeter achieved successive promotions, and Sercombe helped them seal promotion as they beat Rotherham United 1–0 away on the final day of the 2008–09 season, manager Paul Tisdale guiding Exeter to League One for only the fourth time in their 105-year history. Sercombe scored just once in the 2009–10 season, in a 2–2 draw against Wycombe Wanderers on 20 March 2010. He scored his first goal of the 2010–11 season in a 5–1 win against Sheffield Wednesday; he scored two further goals that season, in a 3–1 win against Charlton Athletic, and a 1–1 draw against Tranmere Rovers.

On 9 April 2012, Sercombe scored twice as Exeter beat Leyton Orient 3–0 at St James Park. The following game, he scored in a 3–2 defeat to relegation rivals Rochdale. He had given Exeter a 2–0 lead at the time, but Rochdale scored three times in the last 10 minutes of the game to win the game 3–2. Sercombe scored again the following game, this time in a 4–2 home win against Walsall. On 28 April, he scored for the fourth game in a row; however, Exeter lost the game 4–1 to Carlisle United and were relegated from League One.

Oxford United
On 13 May 2015, Sercombe signed a two-year contract with Oxford United after his contract expired with former club Exeter City. He scored a career-best total of 17 goals from the centre of midfield in his first season, helping the Us secure promotion to League One. His goals included a penalty in a memorable 3–2 home win over Swansea City of the Premier League in the third round of the FA Cup. In November the following season he ruptured his medial knee ligament and was expected to miss the rest of the season, but his recovery was quicker than expected and he returned to first-team action as a substitute against Rotherham United in an FA Cup third-round victory on 4 January 2017. In February 2017 he scored Oxford's opening goal in a 2–1 away victory over local rivals Swindon Town.

He appeared at Wembley Stadium in the 2016 Football League Trophy Final, in which Oxford lost 3–2 to Barnsley, and scored his side's only goal in the final of the same competition the following year, a 2–1 defeat to Coventry City.

Bristol Rovers

After being sidelined by Oxford for undisclosed "disciplinary reasons", on 31 May 2017 Sercombe signed with Bristol Rovers for an undisclosed six-figure fee believed to be in the region of £150,000.

Sercombe made his debut on the opening day in a 1–0 defeat to Charlton Athletic. The following Tuesday Sercombe started in an EFL Cup game against Cambridge United in which Rovers won 4–1 with Sercombe scoring the 4th goal.

At the end of the 19/20 season, after a successful spell at the club, Sercombe was released by Bristol Rovers.

Cheltenham Town
Following his release from Bristol Rovers, Cheltenham Town announced the signing of Sercombe on 4 August 2020. He made his debut for Cheltenham by scoring the winning goal in a 1-0 EFL Cup away victory over Peterborough United in September 2020.

Sercombe signed a new one-year deal with the club at the end of the 2021–22 season.

Career statistics

Honours

Exeter City
Football League Two runner-up: 2008–09
Conference Premier play-offs: 2008

Oxford United
Football League Two runner-up: 2015–16
Football League Trophy runner-up: 2015–16, 2016–17

Cheltenham Town
League Two: 2020–21

References

External links

Living people
1990 births
Sportspeople from Exeter
Footballers from Devon
English footballers
Association football midfielders
Exeter City F.C. players
Oxford United F.C. players
Bristol Rovers F.C. players
Cheltenham Town F.C. players
National League (English football) players
English Football League players